Events from the year 1951 in Canada.

Incumbents

Crown 
 Monarch –  George VI

Federal government 
 Governor General – the Viscount Alexander of Tunis
 Prime Minister – Louis St. Laurent
 Chief Justice – Thibaudeau Rinfret (Quebec) 
 Parliament – 21st

Provincial governments

Lieutenant governors 
Lieutenant Governor of Alberta – John J. Bowlen   
Lieutenant Governor of British Columbia – Clarence Wallace 
Lieutenant Governor of Manitoba – Roland Fairbairn McWilliams  
Lieutenant Governor of New Brunswick – David Laurence MacLaren 
Lieutenant Governor of Newfoundland – Leonard Outerbridge 
Lieutenant Governor of Nova Scotia – John Alexander Douglas McCurdy 
Lieutenant Governor of Ontario – Ray Lawson 
Lieutenant Governor of Prince Edward Island – Thomas William Lemuel Prowse 
Lieutenant Governor of Quebec – Gaspard Fauteux  
Lieutenant Governor of Saskatchewan – John Michael Uhrich (until June 15) then William John Patterson (from June 25)

Premiers 
Premier of Alberta – Ernest Manning   
Premier of British Columbia – Byron Johnson  
Premier of Manitoba – Douglas Campbell 
Premier of New Brunswick – John McNair 
Premier of Newfoundland – Joey Smallwood 
Premier of Nova Scotia – Angus Macdonald 
Premier of Ontario – Leslie Frost 
Premier of Prince Edward Island – J. Walter Jones  
Premier of Quebec – Maurice Duplessis 
Premier of Saskatchewan – Tommy Douglas

Territorial governments

Commissioners 
 Commissioner of Yukon – Andrew Harold Gibson (until October 15) then Frederick Fraser 
 Commissioner of Northwest Territories – Hugh Andrew Young

Events
April 22–25 – Korean War: In the Battle of Kapyong, the Canadians hold off the Chinese.
June 1 – The Massey Report into Canadian culture is released
July 10 – A formal peace agreement between Canada and Germany is signed
September 30 - Charlotte Whitton becomes mayor of Ottawa and Canada's first woman mayor of a major city. 
October 27:
 The cobalt bomb cancer therapy is first tested in London, Ontario
 The Duke of Edinburgh, and The Princess Elizabeth, Duchess of Edinburgh (later Queen Elizabeth II), attend an Edmonton Eskimos home game. In the western semi-final, Edmonton beat Winnipeg 4–1
November 22 – 1951 Ontario general election: Leslie Frost's PCs win a third consecutive majority
December 12 – The St. Lawrence Seaway Authority is established.

Full date unknown
Canada's immigration rate rises. Population is 14,009,429.
The Indian Act of Canada is revised to limit coverage of Aboriginal people, excluding Aboriginal women who married non-Aboriginal men.
Louis St. Laurent moves into 24 Sussex Drive, the new official residence of the Prime Minister
Labatt Blue is introduced
The Wartime Prices and Trade Board is abolished.
Thérèse Casgrain, the first woman to lead a provincial political party in Canada, becomes leader of the Quebec CCF.

Arts and literature
November 12 – The National Ballet of Canada gives its first performance in Eaton Auditorium, Toronto.

New books
Morley Callaghan – The Loved and the Lost
Harold Innis – The Bias of Communication

Awards
See 1951 Governor General's Awards for a complete list of winners and finalists for those awards.
Stephen Leacock Award: Eric Nicol, The Roving I

Sport 
April 21 - The Toronto Maple Leafs win their ninth Stanley Cup by defeating the Montreal Canadiens 4 games to 1. The deciding Game 5 was played at Maple Leaf Gardens in Toronto
May 8 - The Ontario Hockey Association's Barrie Flyers win their first Memorial Cup by defeating the Manitoba Junior Hockey League's Winnipeg Monarchs 4 game to 0. All games were played at Shea's Amphitheatre in Winnipeg
November 24 - The Ottawa Rough Riders win their fourth Grey Cup by defeating the Saskatchewan Roughriders 21 to 14 in the 39th Grey Cup played at Varsity Stadium in Toronto

Births

January to March
January 3 – Claude Bachand, politician
January 17 – Carol Marguerite Anderson, choreographer
January 21 – Yvon Dumont, politician
January 25 - Bob McDonald, science journalist
February 16 – Greg Selinger, 21st premier of Manitoba
February 22 – Elaine Tanner, swimmer
March 12 – Susan Musgrave, poet and children's writer
March 16 – Kate Nelligan, actress
March 21 – Lesley Choyce, novelist, poet and children's writer
March 25 – Ethel Blondin-Andrew, politician
March 28 – Karen Kain, ballet dancer
March 31 – Lawrence D. O'Brien, politician (d. 2004)

April to June

April 5 – Guy Vanderhaeghe, author
April 15 – Paul Snider, killer of Dorothy Stratten (d. 1980)
April 18 – Pierre Pettigrew, politician
May 2 – Andrew Barron, ice speed skater
May 3 – Dianne Whalen, MHA for Conception Bay East – Bell Island (2003–2010) (d. 2010)
May 7 – Janina Fialkowska, pianist
May 9 – Christopher Dewdney, poet, author and professor
May 11 
Chuck McMann, football player and coach  (d. 2021)
Ed Stelmach, farmer, 13th premier of Alberta
May 20 – Christie Blatchford, newspaper columnist, journalist and broadcaster (d. 2020)
June 2 
 Larry Robinson, ice hockey player and coach
 Frank C. Turner, actor
June 7 – Terry O'Reilly, ice hockey player and coach
June 19 – Bill Blaikie, politician (d. 2022)

July to September
July 2 – Elisabeth Brooks, actress (d. 1997)
July 4 – Beverly Boys, diver
July 5 – Penny Werthner, track and field athlete
July 20 – Paulette Bourgeois, children's writer
July 26 – Rick Martin, ice hockey player (d. 2011)
July 27 – Shawn Murphy, politician
August 3 – Marcel Dionne, ice hockey player
August 10 – Judy Wasylycia-Leis, politician
August 17 – Robert Joy, actor
September 9 – Jerry Doucette, guitarist and singer-songwriter (d. 2022)
September 14 – Elizabeth Carruthers, diver
September 19 – Daniel Lanois, record producer, guitarist and singer-songwriter
September 20 – Guy Lafleur, ice hockey player (d. 2022)
September 28 – Rick Gibson, artist

October to December
October 8 – Bruce McArthur, serial killer
October 9 – Joe Tascona, lawyer and politician
October 11 – Jim Carr, politician (d. 2022)
October 16 – Brenda Eisler, long jumper
October 26 – Willie P. Bennett, folk music singer-songwriter (d. 2008)
October 27 – Roger Fortin, boxer
October 29 
 Camille Huard, boxer
 Kelly Sutherland, rodeo competitor
October 31 – Doug Bennett, singer, musician and music video director (d. 2004)
November 10 – Marlene Jennings, politician
November 13 – Robert Hilles, poet and novelist
December 6 – Tomson Highway, playwright, novelist and children's author
December 7 - Richard Darbois, actor
December 22 – Charles de Lint, fantasy author and Celtic folk musician

Full date unknown
Robert Priest, poet and children's author

Deaths

January to June
January 1 – Frank Scott Hogg, astrophysicist (b. 1904)
January 3 – Richard Langton Baker, politician (b. 1870)
January 16 – Seymour Farmer, politician (b. 1878)
February 7 – Edna Diefenbaker, first wife of Prime Minister John Diefenbaker (b. 1899)
February 27 – Leland Payson Bancroft, politician (b. 1880)
April 14 – Al Christie, film director, producer and screenwriter (b. 1881)

July to December
August 26 – Bill Barilko, ice hockey player (b. 1927)
September 1 – Nellie McClung, feminist, politician and social activist (b. 1873)
September 14 – James Langstaff Bowman, politician and Speaker of the House of Commons of Canada (b. 1879)
September 20 – William Henry Wright, prospector and newspaper owner (b. 1876)
September 28 – P. L. Robertson, inventor (b. 1879)
October 8 – Charles William Jefferys, artist and historian (b. 1869)
November 20 – Lou Skuce, cartoonist (b. 1886)

Full date unknown
Harry Cassidy, academic, social reformer and civil servant (b. 1900)

See also
 List of Canadian films

References

 
Years of the 20th century in Canada
Canada
1951 in North America